Run Ronnie Run! is an American satirical comedy film directed by Troy Miller. The film is a spin-off inspired by David Cross's recurring character Ronnie Dobbs from the HBO sketch comedy series Mr. Show. David Cross plays the lead and multiple other roles, while Mr. Show co-creator Bob Odenkirk plays multiple supporting roles. The film was produced in 2001 and premiered at the 2002 Sundance Film Festival, before being released released direct-to-video over 18 months later in 2003.

Plot

Ronnie Dobbs (David Cross)—a redneck petty criminal whose hijinks are caught on tape by a Cops-like television show called Fuzz—is noticed by failing infomercial personality/inventor Terry Twillstein (Bob Odenkirk), who notices Dobbs' popularity with lowbrow viewers. He promotes the idea for a Ronnie Dobbs show to television executives entitled "Ronnie Dobbs Gets Arrested" in which Ronnie is arrested in a different city each week. The show becomes a phenomenal success leading to a level of fame & fortune that dramatically changes Dobbs' life.

Cast

 David Cross as Ronwell Quincy "Ronnie" Dobbs / Pootie T / voice of Chow Chow
 Bob Odenkirk as Terry Twillstein / Wolfgang Amadeus Thelonious Von Funkenmeister the XIX 3 / 4 / Daffy Mal Yinkle Yankle
 Nikki Cox as Kayla
 R. Lee Ermey as Lead Kidnapper
 M. C. Gainey as Hark Trellis
 David Koechner as Clay
 Jill Talley as Tammy
 E. J. De la Pena as Jerry Trellis
 Tom Kenny as TV News Reporter / Cult Leader Gleh’n
 Suli McCulloch as Kyle
 Becky Thyre as Tonya

Many of the regular cast members of Mr. Show made appearances in the film, including Paul F. Tompkins as Safari Guy in TV, Brett Paesel as Infomercial Nancy, Brian Posehn as Tank, Patton Oswalt as Dozer, Sarah Silverman as a Network Executive, Jack Black as Lead Chimney Sweep, Mary Lynn Rajskub as herself, John Ennis as Bartender, Scott Adsit as a Police Negotiator, and Scott Aukerman as a Starving Kidnapper.

In addition to members of Mr. Show, other notable appearances include Dave Foley and Andy Richter as Network Executives, Jeff Garlin as Birthday Woman's Friend, Laura Kightlinger as Birthday Woman, Patrick Warburton as Head of Gay Conspiracy, Doug Benson as Editor #3, David Baddiel and Morwenna Banks as British Couple, and Rhoda Griffis as TV Anchorwoman.

Many well-known celebrities had brief cameos in the film, such as Trey Parker, Matt Stone, Ben Stiller, John Stamos, Rebecca Romijn, Garry Shandling, Scott Ian, Kathy Griffin, Scott Thompson, Mandy Patinkin, and Jeff Goldblum.

Production
The film premiered at the 2002 Sundance Film Festival. Bob Odenkirk initially publicly criticized the film's studio (New Line Cinema) and even went as far as releasing the personal email addresses of Robert Shaye (Chairman) and other principals of New Line Cinema to his fans in an effort to get the film released. He later went on to blame the film's failure on director Troy Miller who, as Odenkirk claims, denied him and David Cross the right to do a final edit of the film. Cross and Miller would later reunite when Miller was hired to direct several episodes of Arrested Development.

Reception

, the film holds a 71% approval rating on Rotten Tomatoes, based on seven reviews with an average rating of 6.43/10. Variety said the film failed "to sustain its initial burst of comic inspiration over the course of its feature-length running time."

References

External links
 
 

2002 direct-to-video films
2002 films
2002 comedy films
American comedy films
Films based on television series
Films directed by Troy Miller
Films shot in Georgia (U.S. state)
Films with screenplays by Scott Aukerman
2000s English-language films
2000s American films